UFC Fight Night: Lewis vs. Oleinik (also known as UFC Fight Night 174, UFC on ESPN+ 32 and UFC Vegas 6) was a mixed martial arts event produced by the Ultimate Fighting Championship on August 8, 2020 at the UFC Apex facility in Enterprise, Nevada, part of the Las Vegas Metropolitan Area, United States.

Background
A heavyweight bout between former UFC Heavyweight Championship challenger Derrick Lewis and Aleksei Oleinik took place as the event headliner.

A women's bantamweight bout between former UFC Women's Flyweight Champion Nicco Montaño and Julia Avila was originally scheduled for the event. However, the bout was rescheduled for UFC Fight Night: Overeem vs. Sakai after Montaño's coach, John Wood, tested positive for COVID-19.

A women's bantamweight bout between Ketlen Vieira and former Invicta FC Bantamweight Champion and UFC Women's Featherweight Championship challenger Yana Kunitskaya was originally scheduled for a week earlier at UFC Fight Night: Brunson vs. Shahbazyan. However, it eventually moved to this event instead. Subsequently, Vieira was removed from the card on July 30 due to visa issues and replaced by returning veteran Julija Stoliarenko, who was the current Invicta FC Bantamweight Champion. Vieira was then expected to face a different opponent at UFC Fight Night: Waterson vs. Hill on September 12.

A heavyweight bout between Sergei Pavlovich and Ciryl Gane was expected to take place at this event. However, Pavlovich pulled out on July 15 due to an old knee injury that required surgery. He was replaced by Shamil Abdurakhimov and the bout moved to UFC 253. Gane and Abdurakhimov were originally scheduled for UFC 249, but Gane was forced to pull out of the event after he was struck by a pneumothorax in training. Subsequently, the bout would be rescheduled for UFC 251. However, it was then cancelled a second time as Abdurakhimov was removed from the card for undisclosed reasons.

A featherweight bout between Steve Garcia and Peter Barrett was scheduled for the event, but Garcia withdrew from the bout for an undisclosed reason on July 25 and was replaced by Youssef Zalal.

A couple of fights, including a women's strawweight bout between Nadia Kassem and Miranda Granger, as well as a featherweight bout between Alex Caceres and Giga Chikadze were expected to take place at this event. However, they never made it to the final card due to unknown reasons.

At the weigh-ins, Beneil Dariush and Laureano Staropoli missed weight for their respective bouts. Dariush weighed in at 158 pounds, two pounds over the lightweight non-title fight limit. Staropoli weighed in at 174.5 pounds, three and a half pounds over the welterweight non-title fight limit. Both of their bouts proceeded at a catchweight and they were each fined 20% of their individual purses, which went to their opponents Scott Holtzman and Tim Means (Means was given one additional hour to make weight after initially weighing 172.5 pounds).

Results

Bonus awards
The following fighters received $50,000 bonuses.
Fight of the Night: No bonus awarded.
Performance of the Night: Darren Stewart, Kevin Holland, Andrew Sanchez and Gavin Tucker

See also 

 List of UFC events
 List of current UFC fighters
 2020 in UFC

References 

UFC Fight Night
2020 in mixed martial arts
2020 in sports in Nevada
Mixed martial arts in Las Vegas
Sports competitions in Las Vegas
August 2020 sports events in the United States